Zhongshan North railway station, formerly Shiqi railway station during planning, is an elevated station on the Guangzhou–Zhuhai intercity railway.

The station is located on Minke West Road, Shiqi Subdistrict, Zhongshan, Guangdong Province, southern China. It started operations on 7January 2011. It is the station nearest to the city centre of Zhongshan.

The station will be a stop on the under construction Shenzhen–Zhanjiang high-speed railway.

References

Zhongshan
Railway stations in China opened in 2011
Railway stations in Guangdong